Liu Fengying (born 26 January 1979) is a Chinese discus thrower.

She won the 1998 World Junior Championships and finished second at the 1998 Asian Games behind fellow Chinese Luan Zhili.

Her personal best was 65.20 metres, achieved in June 1997 in Chengdu. The Chinese, and Asian, record is currently held by Xiao Yanling with 71.68 metres.

She is now a faculty member of Guangzhou Sport University.

References

1979 births
Living people
Chinese female discus throwers
Asian Games medalists in athletics (track and field)
Athletes (track and field) at the 1998 Asian Games
Asian Games silver medalists for China
Medalists at the 1998 Asian Games
20th-century Chinese women